Žehra is a village and municipality in the Spišská Nová Ves District in the Košice Region of central-eastern Slovakia.

Geography
The village lies at an altitude of 426 metres and covers an area of 9.658 km². It has a population of about 1700 people.

Žehra Church
The village was first mentioned in local records in 1245, when Count Johann of Žehra was given permission to construct a church there by the church authorities of Spiš.

The Church of the Holy Spirit was completed in 1275. It is noted both for its picturesque appearance, perched on a mound above the village, and for its remarkable series of wall paintings. These have survived despite much damage to the building, including a fire in the 15th century which burnt down its original ceiling. The remaining building is a single nave structure, topped with onion-shaped domes of the 17th century.

The oldest wall paintings are a set of eight consecration crosses, marking the spots where the original building was christened with holy chrism, and thus dating back to the 13th century.

Later in the 13th century, a second stage of painting is marked by the depiction of Golgotha on the tympanum of the church's south doorway.

Frescoes in the sanctuary, dating from the 14th century, showing Byzantine influence, include representations of the Last Judgement, the Last Supper, the Deposition and Saints Cosmas and Damian, the patron saints of doctors.

On the north wall are two notable 'framed' frescoes, one depicting the Pietà, the other showing a symbolic Tree of Life which dramatises the triumph of the Church over the Synagogue.

Later frescoes date from the 15th century.

These paintings were preserved because after an outbreak of plague in the 17th century, the interior of the church was covered with lime plaster for disinfection. They were discovered again in the 1950s when the lime was removed using cottage cheese - effective for this purpose because it contains casein.

The church was declared a Czechoslovak National Monument in 1985, and in 1993 was listed as a World Heritage Site together with the nearby Spiš Castle, Spišská Kapitula, the National nature reserve of Dreveník (a travertine formation), and (since 2009) the nearby town of Levoča.

References

Other sources
The Church of the Holy Spirit, Žehra, Košice, 2005

External links
http://en.e-obce.sk/obec/zehra/zehra.html
http://www.zehra.sk

Villages and municipalities in Spišská Nová Ves District
World Heritage Sites in Slovakia
Spiš
Romani communities in Slovakia